Incantato (also known as The Heart Is Elsewhere or The Heart Is Everywhere) is a 2003 Italian drama film directed by Pupi Avati. It was entered into the 2003 Cannes Film Festival.

Cast
 Neri Marcorè as Nello Balocchi
 Vanessa Incontrada as Angela
 Giancarlo Giannini as Cesare, Nello's father
 Nino D'Angelo as Domenico, a hairdresser
 Sandra Milo as Arabella, owner of a boarding house
 Giulio Bosetti as Doctor Gardini, Angela's father
 Edoardo Romano as Professor Gibertoni
 Anna Longhi as Lina, Nello's mother
 Chiara Sani as Jole, Domenico's girlfriend
 Alfiero Toppetti as Renato
 Rita Carlini as Emanuela, manicurist
 Bob Messini
 Pietro Ragusa as Guido Beccalis

References

External links

2003 films
2003 drama films
Italian drama films
2000s Italian-language films
Films directed by Pupi Avati
Films scored by Riz Ortolani
Films about blind people
Films set in the 1920s
2000s Italian films